Sven Solbrig is a paralympic athlete from Germany competing mainly in category F46 javelin events.

Sven has competed in the javelin at two Paralympics first in 1996 and then winning the gold medal in the F46 class in 2000.

References

Paralympic athletes of Germany
Athletes (track and field) at the 1996 Summer Paralympics
Athletes (track and field) at the 2000 Summer Paralympics
Paralympic gold medalists for Germany
Living people
Medalists at the 2000 Summer Paralympics
Year of birth missing (living people)
Paralympic medalists in athletics (track and field)
German male javelin throwers
Javelin throwers with limb difference
Paralympic javelin throwers